Scorpión FC is a Nicaraguan football team.

It is based in Chinandega.

History
In summer 2004 Scorpión was promoted to Nicaragua's second division.
They played in the Primera División de Nicaragua in 2006/07 but encountered financial problems and were relegated in the end of the season and demoted to the Third Division since they failed to show up for two league games.

Notable coaches
  Eduardo Alonso (2004)
  Carlos Sánchez 
  Martín Mena

References

Football clubs in Nicaragua